Dorrit Moussaieff (born 12 January 1950) is an Israeli jewellery designer, editor, and businesswoman who was the First Lady of Iceland from 2003 to 2016. She became engaged to President Ólafur Ragnar Grímsson in 2000 and they were married on Grímsson's 60th birthday in 2003. Born in Israel, she was raised in the United Kingdom from the age of 13.

Biography
Dorrit Moussaieff was born in Jerusalem, Israel. Her father, Shlomo Moussaieff, was from a wealthy Bukharian Jewish family from Bukhara, Uzbekistan, part of a long dynasty of jewellers. Dorrit is the great-granddaughter of Rabbi Shlomo Moussaieff. Ancestors of hers are said to have woven the robe of Genghis Khan. Her great-grandmother, Esther Gaonoff, was a descendant of Yosef Maimon. Her mother, Alisa, is an Austrian Jew of Ashkenazi heritage, but Dorrit identifies more with Bukharian culture and was raised by her father.

Moussaieff was born and raised in the Bukharan Quarter of Jerusalem. At age 13, she moved with her family to London. She had dyslexia and was home-schooled. In addition to English and Hebrew, she also speaks German, French, and Icelandic.

Moussaieff describes herself as "religious in the soul" and continues to observe Jewish rituals, such as lighting Hanukkah candles.

Business and media career
As a child, Moussaieff spent a lot of time in her family's jewellery store on Hilton Park Lane in London, and went on to become a successful jewellery designer. Other business ventures in which she has been involved are the construction of an office building at Canary Wharf, London and a tourism project in Northern Cyprus. Moussaieff is a contributing editor to the British society magazine Tatler.

First Lady of Iceland
In 2003, Moussaieff married President Ólafur Ragnar Grímsson on his 60th birthday. She has helped present Icelandic culture abroad, promoted Icelandic artists and identified foreign markets for Icelandic products. She is also active in raising money for disabled children.

Controversy
In May 2006, while visiting Israel, Moussaieff was detained at Ben Gurion International Airport after arguing with security personnel who refused to acknowledge her British passport and told her that she was obliged by Israeli law to enter and exit the country using her Israeli passport. The media related the confrontation as a diplomatic incident. The Israeli Embassy in Norway, which handles diplomatic relations with Iceland, expressed regret over the incident and restated the law that Israeli citizens must carry Israeli passports when in the country. Following the incident she applied for Icelandic citizenship which she received on 31 July 2006.

In 2016, leaked files linked Moussaieff to offshore companies and trusts, suggesting that she may have been evading paying her taxes. Her lawyers claimed that, "her business interests were always carried out legally and they were a private matter."

Awards and honors

Honours

Foreign honours
 : Commander Grand Cross of the Royal Order of the Polar Star
 : Recipient of the Ruby Jubilee Badge Medal of King Carl XVI Gustaf
 : Recipient of the 70th Birthday Badge Medal of King Carl XVI Gustaf

Awards
Moussaieff was listed third on the Harper's Magazine List of the Most Connected People in Britain. A local magazine in Reykjavík chose her as one of the best-dressed women in Iceland. Moussaieff was also named Woman of 2006 by the popular Icelandic glossy magazine Nýtt Líf.

Personal life 
Moussaieff's first husband was Neil Zarach, a designer, and they ended in divorce. In 2003, Moussaieff married the President of Iceland, Ólafur Ragnar Grímsson, on his birthday, 14 May 2003, following an engagement of three years.

References

External links

|-

1950 births
Bukharan Jews
Dorrit Moussaieff 
British jewellery designers
British magazine editors
British women in business
British people of Israeli descent
Austrian Jews
English Jews
Icelandic Jews
Icelandic people of Jewish descent
Israeli Jews
Israeli jewellery designers
Israeli people of Austrian-Jewish descent
Israeli people of Uzbekistani-Jewish descent
Israeli emigrants to Iceland
Icelandic people of Uzbekistani descent
Living people
Israeli Mizrahi Jews
People from Jerusalem
People with dyslexia
People named in the Panama Papers
Women magazine editors
Women jewellers